Paul Koscielski (born February 1, 1966) is an American former professional tennis player.

Koscielski grew up in South Bend, Indiana, where he attended John Adams High School. He played college tennis at the University of Texas as team captain and number one singles player, graduating in 1988.

On the professional tour he reached a best singles ranking of 254 in the world. He won a Challenger title at Johannesburg in 1989, defeating Wayne Ferreira in the final. His two ATP Tour main draw appearances both came in the doubles at the Schenectady Open.

Challenger titles

Singles: (1)

References

External links
 
 

1966 births
Living people
American male tennis players
Texas Longhorns men's tennis players
Tennis people from Indiana
Sportspeople from South Bend, Indiana